Agylla pulchristriata is a moth of the subfamily Arctiinae first described by Yasunori Kishida in 1984. It is found in Taiwan.

References

Moths described in 1984
pulchristriata
Moths of Taiwan